Gerard Thomas Hopkins (October 24, 1769 - March 27, 1834) was an American businessman, Quaker religious leader, and uncle to philanthropist Johns Hopkins. Gerard Thomas Hopkins was born on October 24, 1769 in Anne Arundel County, Maryland to Elizabeth Thomas and Johns Hopkins, Senior (grandfather and eponym of Johns Hopkins the philanthropist). On April 16, 1796 at the age of 26, Hopkins married Dorothy Brooke at the Sandy Spring Meeting House in Frederick, Maryland. The couple would go on to have eight children: Mary, Deborah, Elizabeth, Thomas, William, Gerard, Jr., Margaret, and Rachel. Eventually, they moved to Baltimore, Maryland, where Gerard opened his wholesale grocery business and became clerk of the Meeting of the Society of Friends at Baltimore for the Western Shore of Maryland and the adjacent parts of Pennsylvania and Virginia.

In 1812, Gerard’s nephew Johns Hopkins, then age 17, came to work at Gerard’s business in the “counting room” of his grocery store. It is said that during this time, Gerard’s daughter, Elizabeth Hopkins, became Johns’ first love. Yet, due to the Quaker faith’s strong opposition to first-cousin marriage, the two never wed. 

Hopkins was a well-known anti-slavery activist and advocate for the welfare of Native Americans. In 1789, he was a founding member of the Maryland Society for Promoting the Abolition of Slavery and Relief of Free Negroes, and Others, Unlawfully Held in Bondage. In 1804, he travelled to Indiana to visit tribes in the West, and his journal of this trip was published posthumously by Martha Ellicott Tyson. In 1807, he corresponded with Thomas Jefferson about the trans-Atlantic slave trade.

Gerard T. Hopkins died on March 27, 1834 in Baltimore at the age of 64. He was buried in the Friends Burial Ground in Baltimore.

References

Further reading 
 Hopkins, Gerard T. A Mission to the Indians, from the Indian Committee of Baltimore Yearly Meeting, to Fort Wayne, IN, 18O4. T. Ellwood Zell, 1862. With an Appendix by Martha Ellicott Tyson.

1769 births
1834 deaths
Quaker abolitionists
19th-century Quakers
Businesspeople from Maryland